Rima (Arabic: ريمه) is a Syrian village in the Qatana District of the Rif Dimashq Governorate. According to the Syria Central Bureau of Statistics (CBS), Rima had a population of 1,132 in the 2004 census. Its inhabitants are predominantly Druze.

History
In 1838, Eli Smith noted Rima's population as Druze and Orthodox Christians .

See also
 Druze in Syria
 Christianity in Syria

References

Bibliography

 

Druze communities in Syria
Populated places in Qatana District